The Burning Bridges Tour is the debut album from comedian Maria Bamford. It was recorded at Acme Comedy Club in Minneapolis, Minnesota from October 25–26, 2002.

Critical reception
Jenny Nelson of Vulture called the album an early example of Bamford's "honesty and unique creativity. ... It’s nice to hear her coming into her own unconventional style in her earlier material."

Track listing
"My Mother Always Told Me" – 1:44
"Goddess of Little Lake Pequaym" – 2:26
"32AA" – 2:42
"Hollywood Standards" – 0:47
"Small Talk" – 4:26
"Miss the Excitement" – 3:31
""We Do Things a Little Differently Around Here"" – 2:17
"Crazy Cult" – 2:34
"Sexual Harassment" – 2:10
"Lady Boss" – 0:54
"Vennette" – 2:07
"Plan B" – 1:42
"Too Much TV" – 0:56
"Celebrity Homes" – 1:25
"Mom's Religion" – 1:17
"Touched by an Angel" – 2:49
"LA People" – 1:10
"Ritz Carlton Jesus" – 1:58
"Ventriloquist Prayer" – 1:31
"Voicemail Non Sequiturs" – 1:56
"Pterodactyl Song" – 1:01

Personnel
Maria Bamford – performer
John Machnik – mastering, mixing
Susan Maljan – photography
Dan Schlissel – production, engineering, editing

References

2005 debut albums
Maria Bamford albums
Spoken word albums by American artists
Live spoken word albums
2005 live albums
Stand Up! Records live albums
2000s comedy albums